Seely Ridge is a ridge, 10 km long, rising to 1,240 m at the south end, trends northeast from West Prongs to join Heiser Ridge in the Neptune Range, Pensacola Mountains. Named by Advisory Committee on Antarctic Names (US-ACAN) in 1995 after Benjamin W. Seely, who invented the inflatable life raft in 1915 at Pensacola Naval Air Station.

Ridges of Queen Elizabeth Land